Richard Jones (born 10 December 1973) is a Guyanese sprinter. He competed in the men's 400 metres at the 1996 Summer Olympics.

References

1973 births
Living people
Athletes (track and field) at the 1996 Summer Olympics
Guyanese male sprinters
Olympic athletes of Guyana
World Athletics Championships athletes for Guyana
Place of birth missing (living people)